Justino Eduardo Andrade Sánchez (born 29 July 1948) is a Mexican politician from the Institutional Revolutionary Party. He has served as Deputy of the L and LVIII Legislatures of the Mexican Congress and Senator of the LVI and LVII Legislatures representing Veracruz.

References

1948 births
Living people
People from Coatzacoalcos
Politicians from Veracruz
Members of the Senate of the Republic (Mexico)
Members of the Chamber of Deputies (Mexico)
Institutional Revolutionary Party politicians
National Autonomous University of Mexico alumni
21st-century Mexican politicians
Academic staff of the National Autonomous University of Mexico
Academic staff of Universidad Veracruzana
20th-century Mexican politicians
20th-century Mexican lawyers
Mexican prosecutors